Anthony Morris (born March 25, 1992) is an American football offensive tackle who is a free agent. He played college football for Tennessee State. He was selected in the seventh round (218th overall) of the 2015 NFL Draft by the Oakland Raiders.

College career
As a freshman at Tennessee State, Morris played in eight games. As a sophomore, he played in five games. He was named a full-time starter as a junior in 2013, when he played in 11 games. As a senior, he appeared in 11 games, with 10 starts.

Professional career
Morris was selected by the Oakland Raiders in the 7th round (218th overall) of the 2015 NFL draft. He signed his rookie contract on May 12, 2015. He was released during final cuts on September 5, 2015 with an injury designation. On September 6, he was placed on injured reserve. He was taken off of injured reserve on September 28 when he was released.

Morris signed with the Toronto Argonauts on March 2, 2017.

He signed with the Memphis Express of the AAF in 2018 for the 2019 season. He was placed on injured reserve on March 7, 2019, and activated from injured reserve on April 1. The league ceased operations in April 2019.

Morris was drafted in the 10th round in phase 2 of the 2020 XFL Draft by the Los Angeles Wildcats. He was placed on injured reserve on December 17, 2019. He had his contract terminated when the league suspended operations on April 10, 2020.

Morris signed with the Conquerors of The Spring League in May 2021.

References

External links
 Oakland Raiders profile

1992 births
Living people
American football offensive linemen
American players of Canadian football
Canadian football offensive linemen
Players of American football from Memphis, Tennessee
Players of Canadian football from Memphis, Tennessee
Memphis Express (American football) players
Oakland Raiders players
Tennessee State Tigers football players
Toronto Argonauts players
Los Angeles Wildcats (XFL) players
The Spring League players